Kabalromih is a village in Kampot Province, Cambodia. It is inhabited by Khmer Muslims, mostly engaged in fishing and boat building, for which it is famed for.

References

Populated places in Kampot province
Villages in Cambodia